Three Blondes in His Life is a 1961 American neo noir directed by Leon Chooluck and starring Jock Mahoney.

Plot 
An insurance investigator, Duke Wallace, is assigned to investigate the disappearance of a colleague. The wife tells Duke that her husband was fond of blonde women. He is later found killed in a cabin in the mountains. Duke is convinced that a blonde has something to do with his demise and begins looking through his most recent cases.

Cast 
Jock Mahoney as Duke Wallace
Greta Thyssen as Helen Fortner
Anthony Dexter as Charlie Walsh
Jesse White as Ed Kelly
Valerie Porter as Martha Carr
Elaine Edwards as Lois Collins

External links 

1961 films
American mystery films
American black-and-white films
1960s English-language films
1960s American films